Franklin, New York may refer to:

 Franklin County, New York
 Franklin, Franklin County, New York, a town in Franklin County
 Franklin, Delaware County, New York, a town in Delaware County
 Franklin (village), New York, in Delaware County's town of Franklin
 Williamstown, New York, formerly known as Franklin